The Ted Hendricks Award is given annually to college football's top defensive end. The award is named after Ted Hendricks, a member of both the College Football Hall of Fame and Pro Football Hall of Fame, and is presented by his own foundation. In 2022, Caleb Murphy, of NCAA Division II Ferris State University, became the first non-FBS player to win the award.

Winners

References

External links

College football national player awards
+
Awards established in 2002
2002 establishments in the United States